Hosier is an occupational surname. It originates from either the Old English word "", meaning a maker or seller of legwear, or from the French word "", later "hosier", meaning a maker of footwear. The modern surname appears to derive from the English meaning but uses the French spelling. 

A variant origin of the Hosier surname occurred sometime between 1850 and 1950 with conversion of the surname "Hueshaw" to "Hosier".

Notable people with the surname include:

Edward Hosier (died 1571), English politician
Francis Hosier (1673–1727), British Royal Navy officer
"Black Harry" Hosier (–1806), a black Methodist preacher during the Second Great Awakening
Gerald D. Hosier, American lawyer
John Hosier (1928–2000), English musician
Tom Hosier (1942–2015), American football coach

References

Occupational surnames
English-language occupational surnames